

Events 
October 16 – Carlo Gesualdo, Italian composer of madrigals, murders his wife and her lover in flagrante delicto.
 Approximate peak year of the late Italian madrigal style, as represented by Gesualdo, Luzzaschi, Monteverdi, Marenzio, Monte and others.
 The serpent is invented by Canon Edmé Guillaume in Auxerre, France – it was a common instrument in Western European churches for the next several hundred years.
 Baldassare Donato becomes  at St. Mark's in Venice, taking over on the death of Gioseffo Zarlino.
 Claudio Monteverdi, Italian composer, is engaged as string player at court of Duke Vincenzo Gonzaga at Mantua.
 Emilio de' Cavalieri, Italian composer, produces Tasso's Aminto, likely with his own music, for the Medici, at Carnival in Florence.
Giovanni Gabrieli arranges the posthumous publication of works by his uncle Andrea Gabrieli, in Venice.

Publications 
 Gregor Aichinger –  (Venice: Angelo Gardano), also includes some madrigals
 Blasius Amon –  (Munich: Adam Berg)
 Felice Anerio – First book of madrigals for six voices (Venice: Ricciardo Amadino)
 Giammateo Asola –  for twelve voices (Venice: Ricciardo Amadino), also includes two Magnificats, a Salve Regina, a mass, and five laudi
 Paolo Bellasio – First book of madrigals for six voices (Venice: Angelo Gardano)
 Valerio Bona –  (Litanies and other laudas of the Blessed Virgin Mary) for four voices, Simon Tini ed. (Milan: Francesco Tini)
 Giovanni Croce
First book of madrigals for six voices (Venice: Giacomo Vincenti)
 Girolamo Dalla Casa – The second book of madrigals for five voices (Venice: Ricciardo Amadino)
 Giovanni Gabrieli publishes works in the cori spezzati style, in Venice.
 Jacobus Gallus
, volume 4 (Prague: Georg Nigrinus)
 for four voices, book 2 & 3 (Prague: Georg Nigrinus)
 Hans Leo Hassler –  for four voices (Nuremberg: Katharina Gerlach)
 Paolo Isnardi – First book of masses for six voices (Venice: heirs of Girolamo Scotto)
 Orlande de Lassus, Franco-Flemish composer –  for six voices (Munich: Adam Berg) 
 Cristofano Malvezzi – Second book of madrigals for five voices (Venice: Giacomo Vincenti)
 Tiburtio Massaino – Third book of motets for five voices (Venice: Angelo Gardano)
 Philippe de Monte
Fourteenth book of madrigals for five voices (Venice: Angelo Gardano)
 Claudio Monteverdi –  (Second book of madrigals for five voices) (Venice: Angelo Gardano)
 Giovanni Pierluigi da Palestrina – Fifth book of masses for four, five, and six voices (Rome: Giacomo Bericchia for Francesco Coattino)
 David Palladius
Nuptiales cantiones, a book of wedding music, published in Wittenberg by Johann Franck, printed by Matthäus Welack
, published in Magdeburg by Johann Franck
 Andreas Pevernage
Second book of chansons for five voices (Antwerp: Christophe Plantin)
Third book of chansons for five voices (Antwerp: Christophe Plantin)
 Orfeo Vecchi – Masses, Sunday Vespers psalms, Magnificat, motets, and polyphonic psalms for eight voices (Milan: Francesco & the heirs of Simon Tini)
 Orazio Vecchi publishes a book of motets for 10 voices, in Venice.
 Thomas Watson – The first sett, Of Italian Madrigalls Englished, published in London.

Classical music

Births 
July 3 – Lucrezia Orsina Vizzana, singer, organist and composer (d. 1662)
probable
Manuel Machado, composer (d. 1646)
Johann Schop, violinist and composer (d. 1667)
Loreto Vittori, Italian composer (d. 1670)
Caterina Assandra, Italian composer (died c. 1618)

Deaths 
January 20 – Giambattista Benedetti, Italian scientist and music theorist (born 1530)
February 4 – Gioseffo Zarlino, Italian music theorist and composer, maestro di cappella at St. Mark's in Venice (born 1517)
September 20
Lodovico Agostini, Italian composer (born 1534)
Ascanio Trombetti, Italian composer (born 1544)
probable – Maddalena Casulana, Italian lutenist, singer and composer (born c 1544)

 
Music
16th century in music
Music by year